Valck is a surname. Notable people with the surname include:

Gerard Valck (1652–1726), Dutch engraver
Pieter de Valck (1584–1625), Dutch painter

See also
Balck
Valcke